Gassel is a surname. Notable people with the surname include:

Lucas Gassel ( 1490–1568), Flemish Renaissance painter
Nathalie Gassel (born 1964), Belgian writer and photographer
Stijn van Gassel (born 1996), Dutch footballer